Mikhail Lvovich Bezverkhny (born July 27, 1947 in Leningrad) is a Soviet and later Russian violinist, violist and composer.

Life and career
Born in Saint Petersburg in 1947, Bezverkhny commenced his violin studies at the age of 5 at the Central Music School of the Conservatory of Saint Petersburg. He was a student of Liubov Segal (student of Leopold Auer) and Jacob Riabinkov. In 1965 he started his studies at the Moscow Conservatory under Yuri Yankelevich - one of the most prominent violin professors of the 20th century.  He also studied with Maya Gleyzarova, Abram Shtern and Nahum Latinsky. He is laureate of several international competitions:

1967: 2nd prize Wieniawski Competition
1969: 2nd prize chamber music competition in Munich
1972: 2nd prize violin competition in Montreal
1972: 1st prize chamber music competition in Belgrade
1974: 1st prize chamber music competition in Budapest
1976: 1st prize Queen Elisabeth Competition Brussels

In 1978 he was barred from leaving the USSR. In February 1990 he settled in Belgium. Since October 1992, Bezverkhny has been a member of the Shostakovich Trio, and his recordings for Melodya and Deutsche Grammophon now number more than forty. During all these years he has been very intensely active as a violinist, a violist, a composer, a director and an actor. He also worked several times with Latvian-American conductor Imant Kotsinsh (now Imant Airea). They recorded pieces by several composers which includes Spohr and Mendelssohn. Currently he is teacher at the Royal Conservatory of Ghent. His students include amongst others Dmitri Berlinsky.

As a composer, he wrote a virtuoso Suite Gambrinus for violin and piano.

References

External links 
New Consonant Music
Bezverkhni van Gent

Violin pedagogues
Soviet classical violinists
20th-century classical violinists
Russian classical violinists
Male classical violinists
Russian classical violists
Living people
1947 births
21st-century classical violinists
20th-century Russian male musicians
21st-century Russian male musicians
20th-century violists
21st-century violists